Thomas Kurton Heath (1853–1938) was a vaudeville actor with James McIntyre. They started their act in 1874.

References

1853 births
1938 deaths
Vaudeville performers
Blackface minstrel performers
19th-century American male actors
American male stage actors